Australiosoma is a genus of millipedes belonging to the family Paradoxosomatidae.

The species of this genus are found in Australia.

Species:

Australiosoma anulatum 
Australiosoma castaneum 
Australiosoma clavigerum 
Australiosoma combei 
Australiosoma frogatti 
Australiosoma fulbrighti 
Australiosoma inusitatum 
Australiosoma kosciuskovagus 
Australiosoma laminatum 
Australiosoma michaelseni 
Australiosoma nodulosum 
Australiosoma rainbowi

References

Paradoxosomatidae